Elachi is a surname. Notable people with the surname include:

Beatrice Elachi (born 1973), Kenyan politician
Charles Elachi (born 1947), Lebanese-American electrical engineer and astronomer

See also
4116 Elachi, a main-belt asteroid